Mycterus curculioides is a species of beetles belonging to the family Mycteridae.

These beetles are present in British Isles, Italy, Greece, Hungary, Portugal, Spain, Southern Russia and in North Africa.

They are dark grey, have thoracic and golden grey elytral pubescence and the head has an extended rostrum. They can be distinguished from Mycterus tibialis and Mycterus umbellatarum by their narrower and longer rostrum.

References
 Iablokoff-Khnzorian, S. M. - 1985 - Les Pythidae palearctiques - Deutsche Entomologische Zeitschrift, 32(1-3): 193-229
 Vazquez, X. A. - 1993 - Coleoptera: Oedemeridae, Pyrochroidae, Pythidae, Mycteridae - In: Fauna Iberica, vol. 5. Ramos & al. (eds.). Museo Nacional de Ciencias Naturales, CSIC, Madrid, X + 181 pp.

External links

 Biolib
 Fauna Europaea
 Herramientas.educa
 Aramel.free.fr

Tenebrionoidea
Beetles of Europe
Beetles described in 1781